Nationality words link to articles with information on the nation's poetry or literature (for instance, Irish or France).

Events
 Pierre de Ronsard becomes court poet to Charles IX of France
 José de Anchieta, De Gestis Meni de Saa, written about this year, published in 1563; Portuguese in Brazil

Works published

France
 Rémy Belleau, a commentary on Pierre de Ronsard's Second Livre des Amours, criticism
 Jacques Grévin, Olime, containing odes, a pastoral, satirical sonnets and love sonnets; also including poems by Joachim Du Bellay and Rémy Belleau
 Pierre de Ronsard, France:
 Discours
 Oeuvres ("Works"), first edition

Great Britain
 Anonymous, Dane Hew, publication year conjectural (sometime from this year to 1584); comic tale of a lecherous monk murdered by an enraged husband, in which the corpse is moved back and forth between the murder scene and an abbey
 William Baldwin, The Funeralles of King Edward the Sixt
 Thomas Churchyard, The Contention Betwyxte Churchyard and Camell, upon David Dycers Dreame
 Barnabe Googe, The Zodiac of Life, Books 1–3, translation of Marcello Palingenio Stellato's Zodiacus vitae (c. 1528); see also, editions of 1561, 1565
 John Heywood, A Fourth Hundred of Epygrams ("Fourth Hundred" actually means "fifth"; see also An Hundred Epigrammes 1550, Works 1562
 Ann Lok, Sermons of John Calvin including (as Part 2), Meditation of a Penitent Sinner: Written in maner of a paraphrase upon the 51. Psalme of David — generally regarded as the first sonnet sequence in English
 Edward More, The Defence of Women, a reply to The Schole House of Women, which was anonymously published in 1541 (other replies Edward Gosynhyll's The Prayse of all Women and A Dyalogue Defensyve for Women against Malycyous Detractours by Robert Burdet, both 1542); Great Britain

Other
Bernardo Tasso, L'Amadigi, Italian epic poem published in Venice
Judah Zarco, Leḥem Yehuda ("Judah's Bread"), Hebrew work published in Istanbul

Births
Death years link to the corresponding "[year] in poetry" article:
 August 4 – Sir John Harington, sources differ on whether he was born this year or in 1561 (died 1612), English courtier, author, poet and inventor of a flush toilet
 Also:
Henry Chettle, birth year uncertain (died c. 1607), English playwright, writer and poet
 William Fowler, birth year uncertain (died 1612), Scottish poet, writer, courtier and translator
 Alexander Hume, birth year uncertain (died 1609), Scottish
 Christopher Middleton, birth year uncertain (died 1628), English poet and translator
 Sheikh Muhammad (died 1650), Indian Marathi language religious leader and poet
 Anthony Munday (died 1633), English dramatist and miscellaneous writer
 John Owen born about this year (died 1622), Welsh poet writing in Latin

Deaths
Birth years link to the corresponding "[year] in poetry" article:
January 1 – Joachim du Bellay (born c. 1522), French poet
April 19 – Philipp Melanchthon died (born 1497), German professor, theologian and poet
August 12 – Thomas Phaer, also spelled Phaire, Faer, Phayre, Phayer (born c. 1510), English lawyer, pediatrician, author, translator and poet
December 21 – Georg Thym (born c. 1520), German teacher, poet and writer
Approximate date – Hwang Jini (born c. 1506), Korean poet

See also

 16th century in poetry
 16th century in literature
 Dutch Renaissance and Golden Age literature
 Elizabethan literature
 French Renaissance literature
 Renaissance literature
 Spanish Renaissance literature

Notes

16th-century poetry
Poetry